Chaitanya Krishna is an Indian actor who mainly works in Telugu-language films.

Career 
After finishing his engineering from Sagi Rama Krishna Raju Engineering College (Bhimavaram), he worked in a MNC as a software engineer. His love towards acting made him quit his job and then he participated in the first edition of Dhee Ultimate Dance Show. He soon secured his first lead role in Ninnu Kalisaka in 2009 and since then has acted in several Telugu films. He is known for his roles in Sneha Geetham (2010), Ala Modalaindi (2011), Rowthiram (2011), and Kaalicharan (2013). One of his short films, Peek-a-boo (2014), directed by Srinu Pandranki, was selected to be featured in Cannes "Short Film Corner" 2014.

Filmography

Films
All films are in Telugu, unless otherwise noted.

Short films and web series

References

External links
http://www.greatandhra.com/movies/movie-news/mind-blowing-dancer-on-tollywood-screen-21985.html
http://www.thehindu.com/todays-paper/tp-features/tp-metroplus/review-on-an-app/article5948977.ece
 
http://www.thehindu.com/features/metroplus/peekaboo-at-cannes/article5834398.ece
http://www.thehindu.com/todays-paper/tp-features/tp-metroplus/review-on-an-app/article5948977.ece
http://www.thehindu.com/todays-paper/tp-features/tp-metroplus/trailblazers/article5501868.ece
https://www.thetelugufilmnagar.com/2017/03/01/2013-nandi-awards-winners-list/

Living people
Telugu male actors
Year of birth missing (living people)
Place of birth missing (living people)